Condatis (Gaulish: 'confluence') was an ancient Celtic deity worshipped primarily in northern Britain but also in Gaul.
 
He was associated with the confluences of rivers, in particular within County Durham in the North of England.

Condatis is known from several inscriptions in Britain and a single inscription found at Alonnes, Sarthe, France.  In each case he is equated with the Roman god Mars.

Name 
The theonym Condatis derives from the stem condāt-, meaning 'confluence', itself from Proto-Celtic *kom-dati-, from an earlier kom-dhh1-ti- ('put with, put together', i.e. 'grouping, reunion').

The stem condāt- is also attested in personal names, including Condatus, Condatius, and Condatie, as well as in toponyms such as Condé, Condat, Candé, Conte, Condes, Candes, Cosnes, Condate (the old name of Rennes and Northwich), Condom, Condéon (both from *Condate-o-magos), Cond (< *Condate-dunum), Kontz, Conz (Trier), and Canstatt (Condistat).

Cult 
The  cult title is probably related to the place name Condate, often used in Gaul for settlements at the confluence of rivers. 
The Celtic god Condatis is thought to have functions pertaining to water and healing.

Roman altar-inscriptions to the deity Condatis have been found near Roman forts in County Durham in the North of England that may suggest 
a " confluence-deity "  cult and the possibility that  river confluence's may have been used as  pagan  ritual sacrifice sites.

Archaeological evidence

Scotland
An example of an altar-inscription to Mars Condatis has been found at Cramond Roman Fort in the north-west of Edinburgh, Scotland.

England

The following altar-inscriptions to Mars Condatis have been found in County Durham in the North of England.

France
An example of an altar-inscription to Condatis has been found at Allonnes, Sarthe in France.

References

Notes

Citations

Bibliography

 

Gaulish gods
Gods of the ancient Britons
Health gods
Sea and river gods
Personifications of rivers